Pashedu was an ancient Egyptian artisan. Pashedu lived in Deir el-Medina on the west bank of the Nile, opposite Thebes, during the reign of Seti I. Pashedu was a son of Menna and Huy. His wife was named Nedjmet-behdet.  Pashedu was the owner of tomb TT3 and likely TT326.
His titles included Servant in the Place of Truth, meaning that he worked on the excavation and decoration of the nearby royal tombs. Pashedu seems to have succeeded Baki as foreman for the left side during the reign of Ramesses II.

A son named Menna is mentioned in TT3. He was named after his paternal grandfather. Another son named Qaha is mentioned in the tomb as well. It is possible a third man named Nebenmaat (attested in TT219) is a son of Pashedu as well.

References

Nineteenth Dynasty of Egypt